Robert Harald Lindsay Dixon (1800–1858) was an Australian surveyor and explorer, born in Cockfield, County Durham, England. A number of the place-names originally proposed by Dixon were later disregarded in favour of names of Aboriginal origin.

In 1831–32 Dixon carried out surveys in the Upper Hunter and New England districts. 

Having failed to gain reinstatement, Dixon moved to Moreton Bay. On 24 July 1839 he married Margaret Sibly, the daughter of James and Elizabeth Sibly of St Neot in Cornwall.

During that year, Dixon, with assistant surveyors Granville Stapylton and James Warner, began a trigonometrical survey of Moreton Bay for the Government to facilitate free settlement. Dixon was instructed to compile a plan of the district for land sales and town reserves. This angered Governor Sir George Gipps,

Dixon died, at age 58, on 8 April 1858 in Sydney. He was survived by his wife and three of their six children.

Historical contribution
Dixon is credited with having first surveyed and named a number of areas along the East Coast of Australia including:
Cronulla, New South Wales – the named based on the Aboriginal word kurranulla.
Gunnamatta Bay, New South Wales.
The Oaks, New South Wales – and surrounding areas.
Otford, New South Wales – originally named Bulgo by Dixon.
Russell Island, Queensland.
Wellington Point, Queensland.

Legacy 
Dixon, Stapylton and Warner are commemorated on a plaque at the Land Centre, Woolloongabba in Brisbane. The plaque was placed by the Queensland Division of the Australian Institute of Surveyors and unveiled on 7 May 1989 by the Surveyor-General of Queensland K. J. Davies and the Surveyor-General of New South Wales  D. M. Grant.

References

External links

 Hobart Town Gazette and Van Diemen’s Land Advertiser announcing arrival of the Westmoreland
 Map of the colony of New South Wales by Robert Dixon (online)

1800 births
1858 deaths
Australian explorers
Australian people of English descent
People from Darlington
People from New South Wales
Australian surveyors
19th-century Australian public servants
Explorers of Queensland